Manitoba Provincial Road 263 is a former provincial road in the Canadian province of Manitoba.

Route description 

PR 263 began at a 'T' junction with PR 262 north of Scandinavia. The road continued into the park past several church camps and public campsites along the southwestern shore of Clear Lake. The route was gravel for most of its length, except for the section of the route between PR 270 and Onanole.

PR 263 was designated as an east-west route except for the section between Riding Mountain National Park and PR 270, which was designated as north-south.

History 

In the early 1990s, the Manitoba government decommissioned a number of provincial secondary roads and returned the maintenance of these roads back to the rural municipalities. PR 263 was one of the roads that was decommissioned entirely.

After PR 263 was decommissioned, PR 262 was rerouted onto the section between its former junction with PR 263 and Onanole. PR 270 was extended on to the paved section to Onanole and maintained that designation until 1997, when the road was redesignated as PR 354, reconfiguring PR 270 to its current northbound terminus.  The north-south section between Riding Mountain National Park and the former junction with PR 270 is now maintained by the Municipality of Harrison Park.

References
  
 

263